Abdullah Qureshi is a Pakistani singer, songwriter, and music composer. Born in Islamabad, Abdullah gained recognition from his covers on YouTube. Qureshi also featured in popular music TV program Nescafé Basement Season 4 and performed an original song "Awaz Do".

Life and career 
Abdullah Qureshi was born and raised in Islamabad and got his early education from Bahria College Islamabad. He obtained a Bachelor's degree in Mass Communication from the National University of Sciences and Technology. Qureshi started out playing for underground rock and metal bands in Islamabad and later started his own thing under his own name.

He gained popularity from his covers on YouTube that started getting him concerts all across Pakistan. He also appeared in Nescafé Basement Season 4 and performed "Awaz Do" and "Kitni Sadiyan". He released his first song "Tere Liye" in 2013. Qureshi shot to fame with his take on Coke Studio's "Afreen Afreen" and his famous rendition of "Sufi Medley". Since then, Abdullah has released several songs that gained him international recognition. His songs "Kali Santro" and cover of Junaid Jamshed's "Ilaahi Teri Chokhat Par" were also featured in Gulf News. In 2018, Qureshi performed the team anthem for Islamabad United titled "Kitna Rola Dalay Ga". Following his popularity, Abdullah also headlined Levis Live Round 2. He has been actively performing throughout Pakistan and internationally including in England, Dubai and Thailand. 

Coldplay's video of their song "Daddy" had some similarities with Abdullah Qureshi's "Laapata".

On 6 October 2022, Abdullah Qureshi announced to quit the music industry due to religious reasons. The announcement was made on his Facebook page.

Discography

Singles 
 "Tere Liye"
 "Pardesi"
 "Intezaar" (feat. Sarmad Abdul Ghafoor) 
 "Awaz Do"
 "Daastan"
 "Gaai Aasmaan"
 "Kali Santro"
 "The Whistle Song"
 "Laapata"
 "Chan Mahi" – Heer Maan Ja
 "Dil Mera" - Big Foot
 "Aaja"
 "Baat Adhuri"
 Reflections
 Fasana
 Na Javeen
 Hasda Rehnda 
 Kitni Dair
 Daro Na

Collaborations 

 Tere Saath - Eahab Akhtar ft. Abdullah Qureshi
 Suno Ft. Zenab Fatimah Sultan

Covers and Renditions 
 "Sufi Medley"
 "Afreen Afreen" (Cover)
 "Tere Pyar Mein"
 "Husool-e-Aman"
 "Wohi Khuda Hai"
 "Dua (Shanghai)"
 "Ilaahi" (Rendition)
"Evolution of Love" – Nestle Fruita Vitals
"Jee Lay Har Pal" – Pepsi 
 "Aye Khuda" – Adnan Sami 
 "Lips of an Angel"
 "Ansoo"
 "The Scientist"
 "I'm Yours" (Jason Mraz – Cover) 
 "Snow Patrol Medley"
 "Emptiness & Aitebar"
 "Hey There Delilah"
 "Sayonee/Saeen/Zamane Ke Andaaz"
 "Neend Aati Nahi"

Pakistan Super League 
 "Kitna Rola Dalay Ga" – Islamabad United

Heer Maan Ja 
 "Chan Mahi" – Heer Maan Ja

External links 
 Abdullah Qureshi on Facebook
 Official YouTube Channel

Reference Links 

21st-century Pakistani male singers
Musicians from Islamabad
1993 births
Living people
National University of Sciences & Technology alumni
People from Islamabad